The 2001 Maryland Terrapins football team represented the University of Maryland in its 49th season in the Atlantic Coast Conference' (ACC). The Terps closed the regular season with a record of 10–1, with its only loss coming to Florida State. The Terps won the ACC championship and were granted a Bowl Championship Series berth in the 2002 Orange Bowl. It was Maryland's first bowl game since 1990, first winning season since 1995, and first conference championship since 1985.

Preseason
In 2001, despite the Terrapins' disappointing recent finishes, Ralph Friedgen inherited a good situation as their new head coach. His predecessor, Ron Vanderlinden, and the Maryland team had just barely fallen shy of winning seasons for the last two years in a row. Additionally, the 2001 squad was returning many experienced, quality players.

Regular season
Maryland won its first four games, including against strong conference competitor Wake Forest (27–20) and regional rival West Virginia (32–20), to earn a spot in the AP rankings for the first time since September 1995, at #25. The Terrapins then met their main rival Virginia  in College Park, and beat them by a 20-point margin (41–21).

The Terps went on to Atlanta to face #15 Georgia Tech. With 5 seconds left on the clock in the fourth quarter, and Maryland trailing 17–14, the Terps were forced to try for the tying field goal from 46 yards. Their kicker, redshirt freshman Nick Novak, had earlier missed a field goal attempt, bouncing it off an upright, and had an overall unimpressive record in his early career. However, Novak made the 46-yard field goal, sending the game into overtime, where he again made good on a 26-yard field goal, winning the game for Maryland (20–17). By the end of his college career Novak would go on to become the ACC all-time leading point scorer with 393 points, and capture the ACC record for 80 field goals.

After sailing past Duke (59–17) on Homecoming weekend, then #10 Maryland traveled to Tallahassee to face #18 Florida State. Despite being tied through the third quarter (31–31), Florida State handed Maryland their only defeat (52–31) during the season, dropping their AP ranking to #15.

Maryland then defeated Troy State, 47–14. The Terrapins played the season's final home game against Clemson, which they defeated, 37–20, to ensure at least a share of the ACC championship. The following week, Maryland secured the ACC title outright when quarterback Shaun Hill threw a short touchdown pass to Guilian Gary in the front corner of the end zone with 41 seconds remaining to defeat NC State, 23–19. The Terrapins closed the regular season ranked #6 in the nation and first in the conference, with a record of 10–1 (ACC: 7–1). The Terrapins, having secured the 2001 ACC championship, became the first time any team other than Florida State had won it outright since Florida State entered the conference in 1991. Additionally, Ralph Friedgen became the only first-year coach to ever win the ACC title.

Postseason
As ACC champions, the Terps earned a berth in the Orange Bowl to face Steve Spurrier's #5 Florida out of the SEC, in a BCS match-up. The Gators beat the Terrapins with a lop-sided result (56–23). Thus, Maryland ended the post-season with a 10–2 record, ranked #10 in the nation.

Schedule

Roster

Rankings

Game summaries

Duke

Florida State

Troy State

Clemson

NC State

Orange Bowl (vs. Florida)

Team players in the NFL
The following players were selected in the 2002 NFL Draft.

Quarterback Shaun Hill was signed by the Minnesota Vikings as an undrafted free agent.

References

Maryland
Maryland Terrapins football seasons
Atlantic Coast Conference football champion seasons
Maryland Terrapins football